Cashmere often refers to:

 Cashmere wool from the Cashmere goat
 Cashmere goat

Cashmere may also refer to:

Geography
 Old alternative spelling of Kashmir, a northern region of the Indian subcontinent
 Cashmere, New Zealand, a suburb of Christchurch, New Zealand
 Cashmere, Queensland, a suburb of Brisbane, Australia
 Cashmere, Washington, a city in the United States

Art
 Cashmere (painting), a painting by John Singer Sargent 1908

Music
 Cashmere (band), a post-disco and soul music group
 Cashmere (Cashmere album)
 Cashmere (Swet Shop Boys album)
"Cashmere", a song by Rita Ora

Other
 Cashmere Biskit, a character from animated TV series Littlest Pet Shop
Cashmere, a brand of toilet paper sold by Kruger Inc.

See also
 Cashmere Cat (born 1987), Norwegian musician
"Pink Cashmere", a song by Prince
Kashmir (disambiguation)